Riverview Health (formally known as Riverview Hospital) is a hospital located in Noblesville, Indiana, in the United States. It is part of the Riverview Medical Group hospital network. Founded in 1909, it was the first hospital in Hamilton County and today, it is one of the largest employers in the county. It has 161 beds and employees over 350 medical professionals.

History

The hospital was founded in 1909 as the Harrell Hospital and Sanatorium. It was the first hospital in Hamilton County. It was built by Samuel Harrell. Harrell sold the hospital to the county in 1914. This made it the first hospital in the state owned by a county. The hospital provides services to Hamilton County and Tipton County. In 2014, Riverview Hospital changed its name to Riverview Health. That same year, the hospital agreed to pay $1.2 million for ten years for the naming rights to Westfield High School's football stadium. 

As of 2012, the hospital was the 3rd least profitable hospital in the state.

References

External links
Official Website

Hospitals in Indiana
Buildings and structures in Hamilton County, Indiana
1909 establishments in Indiana